Oserheimen Osunbor, (born 5 October 1951), is a Nigerian lawyer and politician who was a Senator of the Federal Republic of Nigeria from 29 May 1999 to 29 May 2007 and the Governor of Edo State of Nigeria from 29 May 2007 to 11 November 2008.

Early life and career
Oserheimen Osunbor was born on 5 October 1951 in Iruekpen, Esan West Local Government Area, Edo State, Nigeria. He attended P.T.T.C Demonstration Primary School Igueben from 1957 to 1962, then Anglican Grammar School Ujoelen Ekpoma from 1963 to 1968 and then obtained his sixth form at Holy Trinity Grammar School Sabongidaa-Ora Edo State.

Senatorial Office
Professor Oserheimen Osunbor was elected Senator for the Edo Central Senatorial District of Edo State, Nigeria at the start of the Nigerian Fourth Republic, running on the People's Democratic Party (PDP) platform. He took office on 29 May 1999.
After taking his seat in the Senate in June 1999 he was appointed to committees on Rules & Procedures, Ethics, Judiciary, Water Resources and Government Affairs (Chairman).
Osunbor was reelected to his senate seat in April 2003.
He also held Various chairmanship positions while in the Senate including: Chairman, Senate Committee on Independent National Electoral Commission (INEC); Chairman, Senate Committee on Judiciary, Human Rights and Legal Matters; Chairman, several Senate Ad-hoc Committees and National Assembly Joint Committees; Chairman, Sub-Committee on Legislature and Legislative List, National Assembly Joint Committee on Constitution Amendment. So profound was his impact that he was nicknamed "Attorney-General of the Senate" by his colleagues.

Governorship
Osunbor was elected Governor of Edo State in Nigeria in April 2007 on the People's Democratic Party (PDP) platform.
On 20 March 2008, the Edo State Governorship Election Tribunal declared that Osunbor's election was invalid, and asked the Independent National Electoral Commission (INEC) to withdraw his certificate and declare Adams Aliyu Oshiomhole of the Action Congress (AC) party the winner.
On November 11, 2008, a federal Appeal Court sitting in Benin City upheld the ruling of the state's elections petitions tribunal, declaring Oshiomole to be the Governor of Edo State.
The decision was based on several voting irregularities.

Personal life
Oserheimen Osunbor is happily married with six children. He is a Christian of the Anglican denomination and a Knight of Saint Christopher

See also
List of Governors of Edo State

References

1951 births
Living people
People from Edo State
Governors of Edo State
Peoples Democratic Party state governors of Nigeria
All Progressives Congress politicians
University of Nigeria alumni
Nigerian Law School alumni
Peoples Democratic Party members of the Senate (Nigeria)
Nigerian Anglicans
20th-century Nigerian politicians
21st-century Nigerian politicians